The Congressional Freethought Caucus is a membership organization in the United States House of Representatives established to promote policy solutions based on reason and science, and to defend the secular character of government. Representatives Jared Huffman and Jamie Raskin have served as co-chairs since the caucus formed in April 2018.

Background

The Congressional Freethought Caucus was unveiled by Huffman during the Secular Coalition for America annual awards dinner in Washington, DC. The Secular Coalition for America released a statement applauding the founding members of the caucus: "The formation of a Congressional Freethought Caucus is a milestone moment for nonreligious Americans in our continued struggle for inclusion in the political process and recognition as a constituency. We are living in a time when one-quarter of Americans identify as nonreligious and yet, despite these demographic changes, our community is still disparaged, stigmatized, and underrepresented in elected offices at every level of government. By proudly and unapologetically standing up for the nonreligious, these Members of Congress have struck a powerful blow against the de facto religious test that keeps so many secular Americans from seeking public office."

According to a 2019 Gallup poll, only 60% of Americans would vote an atheist for president. This is lower than the number who would vote for an African American, Jewish, gay, or Muslim candidate.

Electoral results

History 
The CFC was formed in April 2018 by four members of the U.S. House: Representatives Jared Huffman (D-CA), Jamie Raskin (D-MD), Jerry McNerney (D-CA), and Dan Kildee (D-MI), soon joined by Pramila Jayapal (D-WA). 

The caucus was established in reaction to the influence of religion, especially that of the Christian right, in public policymaking in ways that the caucus's founders deem inappropriate in a secular government. They see such influence as hampering effective and appropriate responses to issues ranging from climate change to gun violence. Huffman has identified as a humanist without a God belief, but has indicated that the caucus is open to religious members who support the use of science and reason and defend a secular government. The American Humanist Association and the Center for Freethought Equality were involved in "helping establish the caucus" by consultation.

Former House of Representatives historian Ray Smock and historian of science and religion Stephen Weldon have noted what they see as the caucus's unique and historic nature. Smock says it hearkens back to the Enlightenment ideas from the founding of the nation, and Weldon points out the political liability of being non-religious. Raskin called the caucus "historic", while Huffman stated it would "help spark an open dialogue about science and reason-based policy".

By September 2018, the caucus had added four more members and actively opposed Brett Kavanaugh's nomination to the Supreme Court of the United States. Membership expanded modestly, with two additional members joining CFC in February 2022.

List of chairs

House members 
All current members caucus with the Democratic Party. The 118th Congress has 16 declared members.

California
 Julia Brownley (CA-26, Westlake Village)
 Jimmy Gomez (CA-34, Los Angeles)
 Jared Huffman (CA-2, San Rafael) – co-chair
 Zoe Lofgren (CA-19, San Jose)
 Kevin Mullin (CA-15, San Mateo)

Georgia
 Hank Johnson (GA-4, Decatur)

Illinois
 Sean Casten (IL-6, Chicago)

Maryland
 Jamie Raskin (MD-8, Takoma Park) – co-chair

Michigan
 Dan Kildee (MI-5, Flint Township)
 Rashida Tlaib (MI-13, Detroit)

Pennsylvania
 Susan Wild (PA-07)

Tennessee
 Steve Cohen (TN-9, Memphis)

Virginia
 Don Beyer (VA-8, Arlington)

Washington
 Pramila Jayapal (WA-7, Seattle)

Washington, D.C.
 Eleanor Holmes Norton (Delegate, Washington, D.C.)

Wisconsin
 Mark Pocan (WI-2, Madison)

Former members
 Carolyn Maloney (NY-12), term ended January 2023
 Jerry McNerney (CA-9), term ended January 2023

Policy positions 

 To promote public policy formed on the basis of reason, science, and moral values
 To protect the secular character of our government by adhering to the strict Constitutional principle of the separation of church and state
 To oppose discrimination against atheists, agnostics, humanists, seekers, religious and nonreligious persons, and to champion the value of freedom of thought and conscience worldwide
 To provide a forum for members of Congress to discuss their moral frameworks, ethical values, and personal religious journeys

Coordinator of the Freethought Equality Fund Political Action Committee, Ron Millar, who participated in planning the caucus, stated specific aims the aforementioned PAC "wants to see", including "action against climate change"; "access to contraception and abortion"; and "maintaining" the Johnson Amendment (which establishes that tax-exempt nonprofits like religious organizations cannot endorse political candidates), among others.

See also 
 Establishment Clause
 Free Exercise Clause
 All-Party Parliamentary Humanist Group (UK counterpart)

References

External links
 Freedom From Religion Foundation: Congressional Freethought Caucus
 Secular Coalition for America: Congressional Freethought Caucus

Ideological caucuses of the United States Congress
Civic and political organizations of the United States
Caucuses of the United States Congress
Separation of church and state in the United States